The 1920–21 FA Cup was the 46th season of the world's oldest football knockout competition; the Football Association Challenge Cup, or FA Cup for short. The large number of clubs entering the tournament from lower down the English football league system meant that the competition started with an Extra Preliminary and Preliminary rounds prior to six Qualifying rounds. The 12 victorious teams from the Sixth Round Qualifying (from the 466 who contested the qualifying phase) progressed to the First Round Proper.

Rounds: draw and playing dates and number of teams

Extra Preliminary to Third Qualifying Round
The five rounds from the Extra Preliminary to the Third Qualifying involved 430 teams from England and Wales. These were arranged into 24 geographically based Divisions which thereby created matches against local rival clubs and limited the travelling required. Through a series of knock-out matches one team from each Division progressed to the fourth qualifying round.

Key to abbreviations in tables below
R=Replay (after first match being a draw)
R2= Second Replay (usually played on a neutral ground)
§=The away club agreed to switch the tie from their home ground
†= result awarded (reason as indicated)

Division 1 (Northumberland / Tyneside / Wearside)
The division comprised 20 teams, of which 8 of the generally smaller teams were drawn into the Extra Preliminary round to reduce the number to 16 teams required for 8 Preliminary round ties.

Division 2 (County Durham / Tyneside / Wearside)
The division comprised 18 teams, of which 4 of the generally smaller teams were drawn into the Extra Preliminary round to reduce the number to 16 teams required for 8 Preliminary round ties.

Division 3 (County Durham / North Yorkshire / East Riding of Yorkshire)
The division comprised 20 teams, of which 8 of the generally smaller teams were drawn into the Extra Preliminary round to reduce the number to 16 teams required for 8 Preliminary round ties.

Division 4 (Cumbria)
The division comprised 14 teams from which 6 Preliminary round ties were drawn, resulting in byes to the First Qualifying round for 2 teams: Cleator Moor Celtic and Carlisle United.

Division 5 (Lancashire)
The division comprised 13 teams from which 5 Preliminary round ties were drawn, resulting in byes to the First Qualifying round for 3 teams: Chorley, Leyland and Horwich RMI.

Division 6 (Lancashire / Cheshire / Derbyshire)
The division comprised 13 teams from which 5 Preliminary round ties with drawn, resulting in byes to the First Qualifying round for 3 teams; Monks Hall, Altrincham and Runcorn.

Division 7 (Liverpool / Cheshire / North Wales)
The division comprised 18 teams, of which 4 of the generally smaller teams were drawn into the Extra Preliminary round to reduce the number to 16 teams required for 8 Preliminary round ties.

Division 8 (Staffordshire / Shropshire / Birmingham / Worcestershire)
The division comprised 26 teams, of which 20 of the generally smaller teams were drawn into the Extra Preliminary round to reduce the number to 16 teams required for 8 Preliminary round ties.

Division 9 (East Riding of Yorkshire / North Lincolnshire)
The division comprised 28 teams, of which 24 of the generally smaller teams were drawn into the Extra Preliminary round to reduce the number to 16 teams required for 8 Preliminary round ties..

Division 10 (West Riding of Yorkshire)
The division comprised 23 teams, of which 14 of the generally smaller teams were drawn into the Extra Preliminary round to reduce the number to 16 teams required for 8 Preliminary round ties.

Division 11 (South Yorkshire / Nottinghamshire)
The division comprised 26 teams, of which 20 of the generally smaller teams were drawn into the Extra Preliminary round to reduce the number to 16 teams required for 8 Preliminary round ties.

This was the only Division in which a team drawn into the Extra Preliminary round won the Division – indeed Worksop Town eventually progressed to the Sixth Qualifying round.

Division 12 (Derbyshire)
The division comprised 15 teams from which 7 Preliminary round ties were drawn, resulting in a bye to the First Qualifying round for Staveley Town.

Division 13 (Nottinghamshire / South Lincolnshire)
The division comprised 18 teams, of which 4 of the generally smaller teams were drawn into the Extra Preliminary round to reduce the number to 16 teams required for 8 Preliminary round ties.

Division 14 (Derbyshire / Staffordshire / Leicestershire / Warwickshire)
The division comprised 15 teams from which 7 Preliminary round ties were drawn, resulting in a bye to the First Qualifying round for Hinckley United.

Division 15 (South Lincolnshire / Northamptonshire / Bedfordshire)
The division comprised 19 teams, of which 6 of the generally smaller teams were drawn into the Extra Preliminary round to reduce the number to 16 teams required for 8 Preliminary round ties.

Division 16 (Norfolk / Suffolk / Cambridgeshire / Essex)
The division comprised 13 teams from which 5 Preliminary round ties were drawn, resulting in byes to the First Qualifying round for 3 teams; Colchester Town, Lynn Town and Cambridge Town.

Division 17 (Essex / East London)
The division comprised 13 teams from which 5 Preliminary round ties were drawn, resulting in byes to the First Qualifying round for three teams: Gnome Athletic, Hoffmanns Athletic and Clapton.

Division 18 (Bedfordshire / Middlesex /  North London)
The division comprised 16 teams all included in the 8 Preliminary round ties.

Division 19 (Berkshire / Buckinghamshire / Oxfordshire / Middlesex)
The division comprised 12 teams from which 4 Preliminary round ties were drawn, resulting in byes to the First Qualifying round for 4 teams: Wycombe Wanderers, Windsor & Eton, Slough and Chesham United.

Division 20 (Surrey / South London)
The division comprised 14 teams from which 6 Preliminary round ties were drawn, resulting in byes to the First Qualifying round for 2 teams: Wimbledon and Guildford.

Division 21 (Kent / Sussex / South-East London)
The division comprised 20 teams, of which 8 of the generally smaller teams were drawn into the Extra Preliminary round to reduce the number to 16 teams required for 8 Preliminary round ties.

Division 22 (Hampshire / Dorset / Isle of Wight)
The division comprised 13 teams from which 5 Preliminary round ties were drawn, resulting in byes to the First Qualifying round for 3 teams: Boscombe, Portsmouth Amateurs and Bournemouth Tramways.

Division 23 (Gloucestershire / Bristol / Somerset / Wiltshire)
The division comprised 26 teams, of which 20 of the generally smaller teams were drawn into the Extra Preliminary round to reduce the number to 16 teams required for 8 Preliminary round ties.

Division 24 (South Wales)
The division comprised 17 teams, of which 2 of the generally smaller teams were drawn into the Extra Preliminary round to reduce the number to 16 teams required for 8 Preliminary round ties.

Fourth qualifying round
The 24 teams qualifying from the Divisions were joined in the draw by 24 (generally stronger) teams who entered the competition at this stage. The ties were drawn on a regional basis.

Fifth qualifying round
The draw comprised the 24 victorious teams from the previous round. Ties were on a wider regional basis.

Sixth qualifying round
The 12 victorious teams from the previous round were joined in the draw by 12 teams (mostly from Football League Division 2 and Division 3 South) who entered the competition at this stage. Ties were no longer regionally based.

1920–21 FA Cup
See 1920–21 FA Cup for details of the rounds from the First Round Proper onwards.

External links
 Football Club History Database: FA Cup 1920–21
 FA Cup Past Results

Qualifying
FA Cup qualifying rounds